Caprivi may refer to:

Places
 Caprivi Region, a former name of Zambezi Region, an administrative region of Namibia
 Caprivi Strip, a part of Namibia
 Caprivi conflict, a secession attempt by the Caprivi Liberation Army and the Namibian government
 East Caprivi, a former Lozi bantustan in South West Africa
 Caprivi, Pennsylvania, an unincorporated community in Cumberland County, Pennsylvania, USA

People
 Leo von Caprivi, German Chancellor 1890–1894